Sebastian Wenta (born 1975), also known as Wentyl, is a former shot putter, strongman, and Highland Games competitor from Poland. Wenta's athletic career started with volleyball, and he eventually moved on to the shot put and discus throw. He began competing in strongman in 2005 and has quickly risen through the ranks. His biggest accomplishment to date is coming in second at the 2007 World's Strongest Man contest.

Wenta lives in Tczew, Poland and owns two sports outlets.

Physical stats
Height: 6'7"
Weight: 330 lb
Biceps: 21 in
Chest: 61 in

Results
 2005
Bronze Medal - Mistrzostwa Europy Highland Games, Szkocja
2nd - Puchar Polski Strongman, Ostróda
1st - Puchar Polski Strongman, Golub-Dobrzyń
2nd - Międzynarodowe Zawody Strongman, Litwa
5th - United Strongman Series, Bangkok
 2006
3rd - Drugi Pojedynek Gigantów, Łódź
1st - United Strongman Series, Kijów (Kyiv)
1st - Puchar Świata Highland Games, Szkocja
3rd - United Strongman Series, Serbia
1st - United Strongman Series, Moskwa
1st - Europa vs USA Highland Games, Irlandia
1st - Polska vs Europa, Borne Sulinowo
3rd - Super Seria, Milin
2nd - Finał Pucharu Świata Highland Games, Szkocja
3rd - Mistrzostwa Polski, Września
6th - World's Strongest Man, Sanya, China
2nd - World Strongman Cup, Grodzisk Mazowiecki
 2007
4th - Trzeci Pojedynek Gigantów, Łódź
2nd - World's Strongest Man, Anaheim, California, USA
 2008
3rd - Fortissimus, Notre-Dame-du-Rosaire, Quebec, Canada
 2009
 Carmunnock International Highland Games Champion, Glasgow, Scotland, United Kingdom
 World Pipe Band Championships 2009, Winner of the Heavies

Personal Bests

Source: http://www.zbjonik.republika.pl/at_08m.htm

1975 births
Living people
Polish strength athletes
Polish male shot putters
Polish male discus throwers
People from Tczew
Sportspeople from Pomeranian Voivodeship
Lechia Gdańsk athletes